Royal Air Force Chedworth or more simply RAF Chedworth is a former Royal Air Force satellite station located near Chedworth, Gloucestershire, England. It was used mostly for training during its existence and has been inactive since the 1980s.

History
Construction of the airfield began in late 1941 and it opened in April 1942 as a satellite station to RAF Aston Down. The first users were detachments of No. 52 Operational Training Unit (OTU), flying Supermarine Spitfires and Miles Magisters. In August two flights were transferred to Chedworth. On 15 January 1943, the flights were assigned to the Flight Leaders School (FLS) within the OTU to teach tactics to fighter squadron and flight leaders. Chedworth proved to be too small and the FLS was transferred to RAF Charmy Down on 9 February.

The airfield came under the control of RAF South Cerney ten days later and was used for flight training by the Airspeed Oxfords of No. 3 and No. 6 (Pilots) Advanced Flying Units and a detachment of 6(P)AFU was based there for a few months. RAF Honiley assumed control of Chedworth in October and it was used by No. 2 (Air Gunnery) Squadron of No. 63 OTU and the Air Gunnery Squadron of No. 60 OTU. They formed a combined gunnery squadron that flew de Havilland Mosquitoes, Bristol Beaufighters and Miles Masters until they returned home in January 1944. 3 (P) AFU returned in a few months later to relieve the congestion at South Cerney. No. 3 Tactical Exercise Unit RAF arrived 17 July 1944, becoming No. 55 Operational Training Unit RAF on 18 December 1944 until 29 May 1945.The site was also used by No. 2800 Squadron RAF Regiment.

RAF Chedworth was also briefly home to the headquarters squadron of the Ninth Air Force of the United States Army Air Forces units during 19 June–9 July 1944 and was used by Piper L-4 Grasshoppers and Stinson L-5 Sentinels of the 125th Liaison Squadron.

Current use
Much of the site remains, including most of the two runways, one blister hangar (of 2 originally), the armoury, and the battle HQ building, but the site is now primarily agricultural.

References

Bibliography

}

External links
Photograph at Geograph
American Air Museum in Britain - RAF Chedworth

Royal Air Force stations in Gloucestershire